Campus Knights is a 1929 American silent comedy film directed by Albert H. Kelley and starring Raymond McKee, Shirley Palmer and Marie Quillan.

Cast
 Raymond McKee as Prof. Ezra Hastings / Earl Hastings  
 Shirley Palmer as Audrey Scott  
 Marie Quillan as Edna  
 Jean Laverty as Pearl  
 J.C. Fowler as Dean Whitlock  
 Sybil Grove as The Matron 
 P.J. Danby as The Janitor  
 Leo White as Pearl's Lawyer  
 Lewis Sargent as The Sport

References

Bibliography
 Michael R. Pitts. Poverty Row Studios, 1929-1940: An Illustrated History of 55 Independent Film Companies, with a Filmography for Each. McFarland & Company, 2005.

External links

1929 films
1929 comedy films
Silent American comedy films
Films directed by Albert H. Kelley
American silent feature films
1920s English-language films
Chesterfield Pictures films
American black-and-white films
Films set in universities and colleges
1920s American films